Jerzy Moes (Jerzy Michal Moes; 29 September 1935 – 27 April 2019) was a Polish film and television actor.

Moes was born in Warsaw, the sixth son of ten children of Aleksander Moes and his wife Barbara Sobańska (Junosza coat of arms). He is also the grandson of Aleksander Juliusz Moes (1856–1928), a Polish landowner and industrialist from Silesia, and a nephew of Władysław Moes (1900–1986).

Selected filmography

 Lotna (1959)
 How I Unleashed World War II (1970)
 Dzieciol (1971)

Bibliography
 Mazierska, Ewa & Ostrowska, Elżbieta. Women in Polish Cinema. Berghahn Books, 2006.

References

External links

1935 births
2019 deaths
Polish male film actors
Polish male stage actors
Male actors from Warsaw
20th-century Polish male actors